J.H. Smith Grocery Store and Filling Station, at 1835 Old Ranch Rd. in Dragoon, Arizona, was built in 1915.  It was listed on the National Register of Historic Places in 2004.

It has also been known as 210 Main Street and is located at a three-way intersection.

It had two c.1920 "bubble pumps" to dispense gas, which originally was delivered by horse and wagon, then later by railway to its above-ground tanks. The pumps and tanks have since been removed.

References

Gas stations on the National Register of Historic Places in Arizona
National Register of Historic Places in Cochise County, Arizona
Transport infrastructure completed in 1915
Grocery store buildings
1915 establishments in Arizona